Marie Montpetit is a former Canadian politician in Quebec, who was elected to the National Assembly of Quebec in the 2014 election as a member of the Quebec Liberal Party. She represented the electoral district of Maurice-Richard (formerly known as Crémazie).

Prior to her election to the legislature, Montpetit worked for the provincial Ministry of Health and Social Services and the World Health Organization.

From October 2017 to October 2018, she was Minister of culture and communications and Minister responsible for the protection and promotion of the french Language.

On November 1, 2021, Montpetit was expelled from the Liberal caucus as a result of harassment allegations filed by a former staffer.

On May 24, 2022, Montpetit announced that she would not be seeking a second term in the 2022 Quebec general election.

References

1979 births
Living people
Quebec Liberal Party MNAs
French Quebecers
Members of the Executive Council of Quebec
Politicians from Montreal
Women government ministers of Canada
Women MNAs in Quebec
Independent MNAs in Quebec
21st-century Canadian women politicians
Politicians affected by a party expulsion process